The Tamralipta Jatiya Sarkar (Bengali : তাম্রলিপ্ত জাতীয় সরকার) or Tamluk National Government was an independent parallel government established in the areas of Tamluk and Contai subdivisions, now in Purba Medinipur, West Bengal, India, during the Quit India Movement (1942-1944). It was the first people’s government, which was established in British India amidst sloganeering of ‘British, Leave India!’, and had the honour of being only parallel government running independently for two years during British Raj.  This national government was formed by Satish Chandra Samanta, who was the supreme leader till his arrest in June 1943, and he was aided by several ministers and protagonists like Sushil Kumar Dhara, Ajoy Mukherjee and Matangini Hazra. The parallel government had set up police stations, military departments, courts and revenue collection system, and had completely overthrown the civil government of the British by dispensing justice, maintaining peace and security, and helping the poor and the distressed. It was dissolved on the explicit directions of Mahatma Gandhi, taking note of the end of the Quit India Movement in August, 1944.

The rebels of Midnapore were inspired by Gandhi, but they did not confine themselves to the Gandhian practice of non-violence. It was not Gandhi’s ‘ahimsa’ which moved the rebels so much as his precept ‘Do or Die’. A good deal of underground literature (including that of the ‘Biplabi’, the mouthpiece of the Tamralipta jatiya Sarkar) cropped up with that precept as the motto. The Jatiya Sarkar launched an armed militia 'Vidyut Vahini', commanded by Sushil Kumar Dhara, in the hope of helping Subhas Bose’s Indian National Army, should it succeed in invading British-held Bengal (it didn’t).

Legacy 

In 2002, the Ministry of Communication of India released a Tamralipta Jatiya Sarkar commemorative  stamp. The stamp depicts Ajoy Mukherjee, who became the Chief Minister of West Bengal three times, and Matangini Hazra who laid down her life during the march.

References 

1942 establishments in India
1944 disestablishments in India
Quit India Movement